Burning for You is the eleventh studio album by English band Strawbs, with cover art by Patrick Woodroffe.

Recording
The producer of the album Jeffrey Lesser was, according to songwriter/singer Dave Cousins, "...a great engineer but didn't understand the dynamics of the band". The album was intended to be the final one by the band but Cousins was persuaded to carry on when he met with Clive Davis of Arista Records. The final track here "Goodbye" was meant to be his final word on his career leading the band.

Track listing
Side one
"Burning for Me" (Dave Cousins, John Mealing) – 4:01
"Cut Like a Diamond" (Cousins, Chas Cronk) – 3:44
"I Feel Your Loving Coming On" (Dave Lambert) – 2:56
"Barcarole (For the Death of Venice)" (Cousins, Cronk) – 3:25
"Alexander the Great" (Cousins, Lambert) – 3:59

Side two
"Keep on Trying" (Cousins, Cronk) – 3:15
"Back in the Old Routine" (Cousins, Cronk, Lambert) – 3:17
"Heartbreaker" (Lambert) – 4:40
"Carry Me Home" (Cronk) – 3:28
"Goodbye (Is Not an Easy Word to Say)" (Cousins) – 3:44

Esoteric expanded edition (released 19 March 2020)
"Joey and Me" (Cousins)
" Goodbye” (Alternate mix)(Cousins)
"Barcarole (Alternate mix)(Cousins & Cronk)
"Heartbreaker” (Dave Cousins and The Intergalactic Touring Band (Cousins)

Personnel
Dave Cousins – vocals (1–10) (lead vocals 1, 2, 4, 5, 6, 10)  acoustic guitar (2–4, 6–8)
Dave Lambert – lead guitar (1–6, 8–10), vocals (3–9) (lead vocals 3, 6, 7, 8, 9), acoustic guitar (5, 8), acoustic lead guitar (7)
Chas Cronk – bass (1–10), vocals (3, 4, 6, 7), acoustic guitar (7)
Rod Coombes – drums (1–3, 5–10)

Additional personnel
Robert Kirby – piano (3), synthesizer (3), orchestral arrangement (3, 9), electric piano (4, 6, 9), Mellotron (4–6, 8), clavinet (8), acoustic guitar (7)
John Mealing – piano (1, 7, 9, 10), synthesizer (1, 3–5, 8), Mellotron (3), harpsichord (2), tubular bells (3), organ (4), orchestral arrangement (1, 10)
Jeffrey Lesser – Producer and engineer
assisted by
Robin Freeman

Recorded and mixed at Relight Studios, Hilvarenbeek, The Netherlands

Release history

References
Burning for You on Strawbsweb
Sleeve notes CD RGF/WCDCD 027 Deep Cuts/Burning for You

Notes

Strawbs albums
1977 albums
Albums arranged by Robert Kirby